
The following lists events that happened during 1853 in South Africa.

Events
 The 8th Cape Frontier War ends
 The settlement of Hopetown is established
 Nicholaas Waterboer, eldest son of Andries Waterboer succeeds as Griqua captain
 The settlement of Queenstown is established
 The settlement of Seymour is established
 The Union Steamship Line is founded
 the right to vote is granted to every property-owning male (including Africans) in the Cape Province. This right was abolished with the introduction of Apartheid in 1948

Births
 20 August - Jan Ernst Abraham Volschenk, landscape painter, is born near Riversdale, Cape Colony

Deaths
23 July - Andries Pretorius (54), Voortrekker leader

References
See Years in South Africa for list of References

History of South Africa